The 2015 Pacific Games, also known as Port Moresby 2015 or POM 2015, was held in Port Moresby, Papua New Guinea, from 4 to 18 July 2015. It was the fifteenth staging of the Pacific Games as well as the third to be hosted in Port Moresby.

More than 3,700 athletes from the 22 Pacific Games Associations plus first time entrants Australia and New Zealand, took part. With almost 300 sets of medals, the games featured 28 sports, 19 of which are on the 2016 Summer Olympics program. Only men's football was a straight qualifying event for Rio 2016. These sporting events took place in 14 venues in the host city.

The host nation, Papua New Guinea, topped the medal table for only the second time, winning the most golds (88) and most medals overall (217). New Caledonia finished second making it only the third time the French territory had failed to place first. Tahiti finished third. Tuvalu won its first ever gold medal at the games, and the debuting teams from Australia and New Zealand won their first Pacific Games medals including gold.

Host selection
Five Pacific Island countries expressed interests in hosting the fifteenth edition of the games as soon as the bidding process began. They were American Samoa, Papua New Guinea, Solomon Islands, Tonga, and Vanuatu. By March 2009, only three were serious bidders – Papua New Guinea, Solomon Islands, and Tonga. On 20 September 2009, the Solomon Islands National Olympic Committee President – Fred Maetoloa, in a press statement announced the withdrawal of the Solomons bid following the withdrawal of the Solomon Island government's commitment and support.

On 27 September 2009, the Pacific Games Council, at its meeting coinciding with the 2009 Pacific Mini Games, elected Port Moresby, Papua New Guinea as the host of the 2015 Games. The final vote was 25–22 in favor of Port Moresby over Tonga to host.

Development and preparation
After Port Moresby were awarded the rights to host the 2015 games in 2009, preparations had been slow to what was expected by many. In 2011, the PNG pacific games organisers were unsure if the country would stage the games in time. On 26 April 2012, Pacific Games Council president Vidhya Lakhan arrived in Port Moresby to assess the state of preparation for the games. After a week long presentation by the PNG Pacific Games Venue, Infrastructure and Equipment Committee (VIEC), on May 2, on behalf of the Pacific Games council, Lakhan announced that Papua New Guinea will still host the 2015 Pacific Games.

Venues and infrastructure
A total of 14 venues hosted 28 sports at the 2015 Pacific Games in Port Moresby.

Sports Complex
There were two major sporting complexes that played host to many sports. The Sir John Guise complex which hosted nine different sporting codes namely Weightlifting, Powerlifting, Rugby 7s, Rugby league nines, beach volleyball, field hockey, and Athletics. The Bisini sports field was the other sports complex that hosted football, cricket, softball, Touch rugby and lawn bowls.

Medals

Games baton
The 2015 Pacific Games baton was revealed on 23 February 2015 in Port Moresby. The baton was designed and created by Gickmai Kundun, a well known local artist from the Simbu Province. Shaped as an hourglass, the baton depicts a kundu drum which traditionally is used as a communication tool. It (baton) is made out of one of Papua New Guinea's major resource commodity, copper. Kundun said the purpose of the games baton was to unite the people of Papua New Guinea, and the kundu drum was the perfect fit.

Games baton relay
The 2015 Pacific Games baton relay was officially launched on 25 March 2015 by the Prime Minister of Papua New Guinea, Hon Peter O'Neill in Port Moresby. The journey began on 26 March to officially mark 100 days to go until the opening ceremony. The baton travelled to all 22 cities and towns of the 22 provinces including more than 150 rural villages in the country. On June 20, the baton made a special visit to Cairns, Australia to give a chance to the large Papua New Gunean community to get a  first hand glimpse. On 29 June, the baton arrived to the National Capital District (host province) where the relay continued for the last 5 days.

Volunteers
From over 6,000 volunteer applications received by the chief executive officer for the 2015 games, only 3,500 of this applicants were carefully screened and handpicked during the recruitment phase. The 3,500 volunteers were then divided into 175 teams that worked throughout the games in key functional areas such as games village operations, transport, technology, logistics and translators etc.

The Games
The official dates of the 2015 Pacific Games were July 4 to 18, however, competitions for Basketball, Football, Table tennis, and Touch rugby began on July 3 (one day earlier).

Sports

There were 28 sports featured at the 2015 Pacific Games.

Note: A number in parentheses indicates how many medal events were contested in that sport.

Participating countries
A total of 24 countries took part in the 2015 Pacific Games. This was with the inclusion of Australia and New Zealand for the first time in the history of the Games. The two countries were invited to participate in four sports; sailing, taekwondo, rugby sevens and weightlifting.

The Pacific Games Council said in July 2014 that the participation of the two countries would improve the quality of competition in the Pacific Games. The inclusion of Australia and New Zealand was on a trial basis, with a review scheduled after the Games to determine its success.

Note: A number in parentheses indicates how many athletes were registered prior to the Games, with that number expected to diminish by the Games' start. Clicking on the number will take you to a page on that nation's delegation to the 2015 Games.

Calendar
The following table provides a summary of the competition schedule.

Medal table
Host nation Papua New Guinea topped the overall medal table for only the second time ever. It was also the third Pacific Games in history where New Caledonia had failed to finish first.
Key
 Host nation

Ceremonies

Opening ceremony
The opening ceremony was held at the Sir John Guise Stadium in Port Moresby, Papua New Guinea, between 18:00 and 22:00 (GMT+10), on 4 July 2015. The Head of the Commonwealth and Queen of Papua New Guinea, Queen Elizabeth II, was represented by her son, Prince Andrew, Duke of York. Airleke Ingram was its artistic director, with executive producer being Merryn Hughes from the Makoda Productions. Live musical performers included Jamie-Lee Chan, Jagarizzar, with Ngaire Joseph, and duo group Twin Tribe who performed Winds of Change as the closing act. A special performance by Sir George Telek and a medley from Papua New Guinea's all-time music greats - the Paramana Strangers, Pati Potts Doi, and Tom Larry.

Parade of nations
As per games tradition, each PGA paraded into the arena for the opening ceremony with each delegation being led by a flag bearer from their respective teams. Following tradition, the host of the previous games, New Caledonia, enters first followed by the rest of the participating PGA's in alphabetical order. The host nation of Papua New Guinea enters last. Each nation was preceded by a placard bearer carrying a sign with the country's name.

Below is a list of parading countries and their announced flag bearer, in the same order as the parade. This is sortable by country name, flag bearer's name, or flag bearer's sport.

Marketing

Mascot
The official mascot for the 2015 games, 'Tura the Kokomo', was designed by a 13-year-old boy named Taka Seigori from Tubuseria, a motuan village - located 30 minutes drive from Port Moresby. 'Tura the Kokomo' depicts a modern, cheeky and funny Hornbill - known in Papua New Guinea as a 'Kokomo'. The bird is known to possess the attributes of friendliness and cheekiness. Colours seen on the crown of 'Tura the Kokomo' are the colours of the 2015 Pacific Games logo.

Sponsors

See also
 2016 Summer Olympics
 2017 Asian Indoor and Martial Arts Games
 2017 Pacific Mini Games
 2018 Commonwealth Games

Notes
 Athletics: The total of 48 events contested in 2015 included four parasport events: Men's shot put – secured throw, women's shot put – ambulatory, men's javelin – ambulatory, and men's 100m – ambulatory.

 Boxing: Women's events were included for 2015. The weight classes used by the IOC, i.e. flyweight (48–51 kg), lightweight (57–60 kg), and middleweight (69–75 kg) were added to the schedule. There were ten weight classes for men.

 Football: Men's tournament had eight teams (including New Zealand) and the women's had seven teams. Both were qualification events for the 2016 Summer Olympics.

 Karate: The Kumite tournament included six weight divisions for men and five for women. The schedule also included individual and team Kata events for men and women.

 Men's softball was not able to be included in the program as the sport did not meet the criterion of the Pacific Games charter requiring nominations for the event from at least six countries. Women's softball was included.

 Swimming: The schedule for Taurama Pool included 40 events; 19 for men, 19 for women, and two mixed team relays. The open water swim also included a men's event and a women's event.

 Table tennis: The total of 11 events contested in 2015 included four parasport events: Men's singles – seated,  women's singles – seated, men's singles – ambulatory, and women's singles – ambulatory.

 Weightlifting: The total of 45 events contested in 2015 was split into 15 weight classes (eight for men and seven for women) with three sets of medals awarded (for the snatch, clean and jerk, and combined total) in each class.

References

Sources

External links
2015 Pacific Games results archive on the Oceania Sport Information Centre webpage
 Official website

 
Pacific Games by year
International sports competitions hosted by Papua New Guinea
Port Moresby
Pacific Games
Pacific Games
Pacific Games
Pacific Games